The 2013 Gold Coast Sevens was the first tournament of the 2013-2014 Sevens World Series. It was held over the weekend of 12–13 October 2013 at Robina Stadium (known for sponsorship reasons as Skilled Park) in Queensland, Australia. It was the eleventh edition of the Australian Sevens tournament and the first stop of the 2013–14 IRB Sevens World Series.

Format
The teams were drawn into four pools of four teams each. Each team played everyone in their pool one time. The top two teams from each pool advanced to the Cup/Plate brackets. The bottom two teams from each group went to the Bowl/Shield brackets.

Teams
The participating teams and schedule were announced on 11 September 2013. They are the same teams as the previous year.

Pool Stage

Pool A

Pool B

Pool C

Pool D

Knockout stage

Shield

Bowl

Plate

Cup

Player statistics

Points scored

Tries scored

Dream Team

The 2013 Gold Coast Sevens 'Dream Team' as voted for by the fans.

  Ed Jenkins 
  Oscar Ouma 
  Scott Curry
  Justin Geduld 
  Tim Mikkelson 
  Joel Webber 
  Ilai Tinai

References

External links
Gold Coast Sevens

Australian Sevens
Gold Coast Sevens
Gold Coast Sevens
Sport on the Gold Coast, Queensland